Storm Song (foaled February 28, 1994 in Kentucky) is a retired American thoroughbred racemare.

Background
Storm Song was a bay filly bred by the partnership of William S. Farish III and Dinny Phipps.

Racing career
During her racing career, Storm Song was owned by Dogwood Stable and trained by Nick Zito. She won the 1996 Breeders' Cup Juvenile Fillies and was voted the Eclipse Award as American Champion Two-Year-Old Filly.  During her racing career, Storm Song won four of her twelve starts and earned $1,020,050.

Breeding record
Storm Song's daughter Another Storm is the dam of the Irish St Leger winner Order of St George.

Pedigree

References

1994 racehorse births
Racehorses bred in Kentucky
Racehorses trained in the United States
Breeders' Cup Juvenile Fillies winners
Eclipse Award winners
Phipps family
Thoroughbred family 1-o